Tilde Johansson, (born 5 January 2001) is a Swedish athlete who competes in several disciplines. She competed in 60 metres hurdles at the 2019 European Athletics Indoor Championships in Glasgow. At the European Athletics U18 Championships 2018 she won the gold medal in long jump with 6,33 m. She competed at the 2019 World Athletics Championships in Doha, in the Women's long jump event, where she finished at the 17th place in the qualification.

Personal best

References

Living people
Swedish female long jumpers
Swedish female sprinters
2001 births
21st-century Swedish women